Selenochilus omalleyi is a species of beetle in the family Carabidae, endemic to New Zealand.

References

Psydrinae
Beetles described in 2013